GSZ may refer to:
 German Society for Stem Cell Research
 Granite Mountain Air Station, in Alaska, United States
 Grün Stadt Zürich, a municipal department of the city of Zurich, Switzerland
 GSZ Stadium, in Larnaca, Cyprus
 GSZ Stadium (1928), demolished 1989